Vasili Aleksandrovich Slobodko (born 18 June 1973) is a former Russian football player.

External links
 

1973 births
Sportspeople from Bryansk
Living people
Russian footballers
Association football goalkeepers
Russian Premier League players
PFC Krylia Sovetov Samara players
FC Volgar Astrakhan players
FC Luch Vladivostok players
FC Neftekhimik Nizhnekamsk players
FC Dynamo Bryansk players